Rebecca Dawn Lockhart  (November 20, 1968 – January 17, 2015) was an American politician and Republican member of the Utah House of Representatives. Lockhart represented the 64th District in Provo, Utah.  Lockhart was the first female Speaker of the House in Utah, serving until the end of 2014, when she chose not to run again.

Early life and career
Lockhart was born in Reno, Nevada and attended college at Brigham Young University where she obtained a degree in nursing.

Lockhart's husband, Stan Lockhart, served as a member of the Provo City Council and previously served as chair of the Utah Republican Party. Stan Lockhart currently works as a lobbyist for Micron/IM Flash Tech. The Lockharts lived together in Provo, Utah, where the couple raised their family.

Political career
Becky Lockhart served in the Utah House of Representatives for sixteen years. She announced in 2014 that she would not be seeking reelection that year, and pundits claimed that she may have been focusing her efforts on running in Utah’s 2016 Gubernatorial Election

During the 2013 and 2014 legislative sessions, Lockhart served on a variety of committees, including the Executive Appropriations Committee, the House Legislative Expense Oversight Committee, the Administrative Rules Review Committee, the Legislative Management Committee, and the Legislative Audit Subcommittee. She also served on the Commission on Federalism, the Education Task Force, the Subcommittee on Oversight, and the Utah Constitutional Revision Commission.

2014 sponsored legislation
Serving as Speaker of the House, Lockhart did not file any bills under her name. In 2014 Lockhart's primary legislative project was HB 131S03, the Public Education Modernization Act, filed under Representative Francis Gibson.

Pivotal legislation
HB 131S03, the Public Education Modernization Act, was particularly controversial. The proposed legislation called for $200–$300 million in state funds to replace textbooks with tablet computers in the state's classrooms. The bill was essentially killed in budget negotiations.

Among other projects while in the state legislature, Lockhart pushed for a radar at Provo Municipal Airport.  She also proposed a revised tax system that would greatly increase the amount of taxes levied by Utah on chewing tobacco.

HB477 Republican leadership controversy 
At the close of the 2011 Utah legislative session, there was open concern expressed by one representative that, under Republican Party Leadership (who have a large majority in both houses), legislators were pressured to vote for HB477, which denied the public access to certain forms of government communication. There was vast public outcry over the bill which was hurriedly presented and passed under her, and other Republican leaders' oversight.

Death
Lockhart died at her home in Provo, Utah on January 17, 2015, from Creutzfeldt–Jakob disease, "an unrecoverable and extremely rare neurodegenerative brain disease". She had begun to develop signs of the condition a few weeks before her death. The illness had led to her admission to the hospital a few days after she left office.

Tribute
In 2016, the Utah House of Representatives building on Capitol Hill was named the Rebecca D. Lockhart building. In 2017 the Rebecca D. Lockhart Arena at Utah Valley University was named after Lockhart.

See also
 54th Utah State Legislature
 List of female speakers of legislatures in the United States

References

External links
Campaign site
Rebecca Lockhart at Vote Smart
Rebecca Lockhart at Ballotpedia
Rebecca Lockhart at the National Institute on Money in State Politics

1968 births
2015 deaths
Latter Day Saints from Nevada
Brigham Young University alumni
Deaths from Creutzfeldt–Jakob disease
Neurological disease deaths in Utah
Infectious disease deaths in Utah
Politicians from Provo, Utah
Politicians from Reno, Nevada
Speakers of the Utah House of Representatives
Republican Party members of the Utah House of Representatives
Women state legislators in Utah
American nurses
American women nurses
21st-century American politicians
21st-century American women politicians
20th-century American politicians
20th-century American women politicians
Women legislative speakers
Latter Day Saints from Utah